The Centre for the Study of Developing Societies (CSDS) is an Indian research institute for the social sciences and humanities. It was founded in 1963 by Rajni Kothari and is largely funded by the Indian Council of Social Science Research Govt of India. It is located in New Delhi, close to Delhi University.

Overview
Kothari left his position as assistant director of the National Institute of Community Development in 1963 to start the CSDS. It was housed initially in a building owned by the Indian Adult Education Association at Indraprastha Estate, Delhi. CSDS later moved in 1966–1967 to its present location.

Library
The library at CSDS started with a few bookshelves in the basement of IAEA and grew up into a full-fledged one by 1970. It is meant primarily for research and higher learning in the field of social sciences and humanities. The collection consists of about 29,000 books and 5,000 bound volumes of journals and a modest set of reports and booklets. More than 130 journals are received regularly. Apart from works on contemporary themes, the library houses a collection of works on Asia and Africa, arms race and peace movement, non-European perspectives, science studies, ecology and environment, and human rights. There is a separate collection of Hindi books covering a broad range of subjects including literature. The access to the collection has been computerized and the catalogue can be accessed through any computer in the centre. The CSDS library is a member of the Developing Libraries Network and the Social Science Libraries Network.

Data unit
The CSDS Data Unit, established in 1965, maintains an archive of survey data on political behaviour and attitudes, spanning over four decades. The unit also holds a number of secondary data sets, especially on elections in India.

Programmes 
Programmes in the Centre include:

Lokniti Programme for Comparative Democracy
The Sarai Programme
Indian Language Programme

References

External links

Research institutes in Delhi
Social science institutes
Organizations established in 1963
Humanities institutes
1963 establishments in Delhi